Operator #5 was a pulp hero that appeared in his own ten cent pulp magazine. It was soon renamed Secret Service Operator #5 and was published by Popular Publications between 1934 and 1939.

Characters
Within the world of the series, America was still beset by the Great Depression; Jimmy Christopher was a secret agent, codenamed "Operator No. 5", for United States Intelligence, and starred in a number of fast paced stories revolving around America's enemies who pledged war, death, and bloody destruction against the nation. The enemies were many, but often from countries with fictional names. The colour themes of the enemy nations probably come from War Plan Red where America considered a war against Britain and other countries some years earlier.

Christopher often bore two trademarks: a skull ring (with a tiny capsule of a deadly poison gas inside which could kill a large auditorium full of people) and a rapier which was kept curled inside his belt. He was aided by a number of people in the various wars: Diane Elliot, his girlfriend; Tim Donovan, who quickly grew from a youngster who Christopher had saved from great poverty to a two-fisted young man; Nan Christopher, his twin sister; John Christopher, his father who was a retired operative known as Q-6 who after his last case ended up with a bullet near his heart; Washington Chief of Intelligence Z-7; and friend "Slips" McGuire, among many others, some of whom gave their lives for America.

Writers and plotlines
The magazine ran for 48 issues, from April 1934 to November 1939. One final story was written but never published. Stories were all credited to "Curtis Steele", which was a house name for writers Frederick C. Davis (#1-20), Emile C. Tepperman (#21-39), and Wayne Rogers (#40-48).  Like other such pulps of the day, there were short backup stories by other authors.

Davis left because he got fed up with the publisher's demand of trying to think up a new evil super-power attacking America every issue. Tepperman solved this by writing 13 interconnected novels (starting with #26) that make up The Purple Invasion, a series in which the Purple Empire (an unnamed European power which is a thinly veiled Nazi Germany) conquers the United States after conquering the rest of the world.  Jimmy Christopher led the insurgency against them. The saga is often looked upon as the War and Peace of pulps. The entire Purple Invasion sequence was reprinted in the 1990s by Pulp Review/High Adventure.

In a rare bit of continuity for the pulp magazines, America did not find itself fully recovered in the first novel following the end of the Purple Invasion. Instead, America was still reeling from the bloody war, and found itself vulnerable to yet other would-be conquerors. A new serial dealt with the invasion of the US by an oriental power, obviously Japan, led by the "Yellow Vulture". This sequence started with issue #45, but was left unfinished with the magazine's cancellation due to the real war.

Reprints
In the 1960s, at the height of the camp craze and the success of the Doc Savage reprints (with their great James Bama covers), Corinth Press (an imprint of soft porn publisher Regency) issued eight Operator 5 adventures in paperback. Their low distribution made them collector's items almost from the very first, but possibly because of the poorly drawn covers, didn't generate enough sales to continue the series. Two later attempts were also made to reprint the stories.  Currently, Steeger Books (www.steegerbooks.com) (formerly Altus Press) is reprinting the Operator 5 stories without the additional back-up material, but with the original covers and original interior artwork. These books — smaller than pulp size — are available as Print On Demand at the Steeger Books' website and also at Amazon.com.

New stories
In 2011, Moonstone began running new licensed stories of Operator 5 as a back-up feature in The Spider comic book, another Popular Publications character. These licenses would later be lost.

In 2018, Altus Press started reprinting the Operator 5 novels.

List of stories
Operator #5 stories, giving volumes, numbers and dates:
The Masked Invasion: (Vol. 1, #1; April 1934) Operator #5 comes up against an organisation that can turn day into night, that can black out whole cities, stopping all electricity and even battery powered devices from working, and causing airplanes to fall from the sky. The dread power of darkness is wielded throughout the nation and thousands flee the havoc and ruin that follows the Thirteenth Darkness, which promises ships full of thousands of killers landing in America to take over the country.
The Invisible Empire: (Vol. 1, #2; May 1934) The Yellow Empire is near bankrupt so they decide to take over America and steal its gold. They have a camouflaged airborne fortress, "The Atlantis" which flies up to 13 miles high and no plane (of that time) can come within four miles of that height. Safe from attack, they threaten to rain bombs and poison gas on the population unless America surrenders.
The Yellow Scourge: (Vol. 1, #3; June 1934) The near bankrupt Yellow Empire (Japan) steal an American super submarine, the Neptune, and use it to declare war on America, making it look like America is the aggressor. They also used disguised ships and planes to make it look like America is attacking Britain, Canada, Holland, etc. First appearance of Diane Elliot, who is the sister of agent B-10.
The Melting Death: (Vol. 1, #4; July 1934) America found herself stripped of defenses as battleships, huge guns, skyscrapers, factories and transportation crumbled to dust before the voracious flame. An entire nation was paralyzed with panic, not knowing where it would strike next.
The Cavern of the Damned: (Vol. 2, #1; August 1934) Behind closed doors the black power of Zaava spread its hidden terror throughout America. What made congregations vanish, what made men and women hurl themselves into white hot furnaces? Follow Operator 5 into a death trap as he looks for the answers.
Master of the Broken Men: (Vol. 2, #2; September 1934) The Black Menace snatches away the leaders of the nation and returns them as useless, broken and inept men. The population seethes towards open revolt as the Government of America crumbles before its eyes.
Invasion of the Dark Legions: (Vol. 2, #3; October 1934) A foreign demagogue, mad-drunk with power, greed and lust hovers at America's borders armed with weapons of bacteria, plague and terrible diseases ready to slaughter millions to realise his twisted ambition.
The Green Death Mists: (Vol. 2, #4; November 1934) A mad Mongol Emperor has a weapon which from a thousand miles away poisons the atmosphere. Men, women, children and all living things gasp with seared lungs as they strangle to death from the very air they breathe.
Legions of Starvation: (Vol. 3, #1; December 1934) Apocryphos and his legions wreck the nation's food supplies and threaten America with slavery as its people suffer the cruel pangs of hunger and famine on an unprecedented scale.
The Red Invader: (Vol. 3, #2; January 1935) A happy crowd is milling in Time Square at Christmas time when a huge shell suddenly fell from the sky killing, maiming, destroying. After that another shell fell every twelve hours somewhere in America causing more death and destruction. Two mighty powers are blamed and America teeters on the edge of war.
League of War Monsters: (Vol. 3, #3; February 1935) A group of bitter men the "League of War" plans to plunge the whole Earth into War starting with bloody and organized murder in the heart of Europe. Behind the carnage, a single man who plans to make himself Dictator of the World.
The Army of the Dead: (Vol. 3, #4; March 1935) Zombies marched, soulless storm troopers of a sinister madman's plot. Operator 5 battled the bloody tide that swirled on land and sea and into the Death's Temple itself where if he should die, he would become another mindless zombie recruit for the evil legions.
March of the Flame Marauders: (Vol. 4, #1; April 1935) America is fast running short of oil for its planes, tanks and battleships. Saboteurs and spies plan to destroy America's remaining stocks of oil, leaving America helpless before its enemies.
Blood Reign of the Dictator: (Vol. 4, #2; May 1935) In the fictional state of New Cornwall, Ursus Young has become governor through bribes, cajolery, and executions by secret police. Operator No. 5 fights to stop him, but Young becomes president, dissolves the Constitution, and sets up a guillotine on the Washington Mall to destroy his enemies!  His next victim will be Diane Elliot, Jimmy Christopher's lady love! Text includes footnotes about actual impeachment proceedings and their outcome.
Invasion of the Yellow Warlords: (Vol. 4, #3; June 1935) A new Mongol horde rides out of the east armed with modern weapons: Poison gases, deadly bacteria and thermite bombs, leaving the greatest cities of the west lying in ruins.
Legions of the Death-Master: (Vol. 4, #4; July 1935) Death strikes down the champions of law and order as mobs wander the street spreading hatred in an insidious scheme to decimate the nation from inside.
Hosts of the Flaming Death: (Vol. 5, #1; August 1935) A man in a gold mask is behind numerous acts of sabotage which are done in an effort to ruin the American economy. Operator#5 goes after the Ukrainian ambassador who is his only lead.
Invasion of the Crimson Death-Cult: (Vol. 5, #2; September 1935) The evil cult of Kazma comes from the wastes of Asia to strike all who oppose it with madness, amnesia and agonising death. A deadly new weapon in their possessions silently destroys even the tallest of buildings, and entire cities.
Attack of the Blizzard-Men: (Vol. 5, #3; October 1935) The greatest military genius of the time unleashes an invasion of tanks, submarines and armoured warriors on America as it suffers from a debilitating cold.
Scourge of the Invisible Death (Vol. 5, #4; November 1935) In which Christopher fights against a British secret society which wanted to bring America down with the villain dressing like a War of Independence (British) redcoat. The man used machines which could open up holes in our atmosphere allowing deadly cosmic rays from space to carry out his threats.
Raiders of the Red Death: (Vol. 6, #1; December 1935) Featured Montezuma the Third who wanted to establish an Aztec empire using a weapon which caused people to explode. Captives were sacrificed to ancient gods and America seemed condemned to slavery.
War Dogs of the Green Destroyer: (Vol. 6, #2; January 1936) Featured a dictator from Etoria, a tiny Mediterranean nation armed with a green gas that causes everything it touches to burst into flame.
Rockets from Hell: (Vol. 6, #3; February 1936) New England has fallen to the invaders and the rest of the country is set to follow. With Tim Donovan captured and tortured and Diane doubting her own loyalty, Operator 5 is hampered by the very authorities he is trying to help. His only chance is a one-man attack on his enemies.
War Master from the Orient: (Vol. 6, #4; March 1936) A waterfront coolie from Hong Kong becomes the war master of Asia and Russia and armed with a new weapon which makes the bravest man a craven coward, he marches ruthlessly to conquer the world.
Crime's Reign of Terror: (Vol. 7, #1; April 1936) Using promises of great wealth for all who join him, The Scarlet Baron leads a murderous army across a nation gone mad.
Death's Ragged Army: (Vol. 7, #2; June 1936) Beginning of The Purple Invasion story arc. Where we see America on the twenty second day of an invasion by the Purple Empire under Emperor Maximilian I, who planned a reign of slaughter but was killed by a bomb thrown by Plugger Dugan. This however gave his even more bloodthirsty son, Rudolph a chance to take over in his stead, claiming that Operator #5 had killed Maximillian. As the story starts, the invaders from the Central Empire (Germany?) held all New England and most of the Eastern Seaboard. On the last page, with the President in a temporary HQ in Jacksonville, Florida appoints Jimmy Christopher in charge of all manoeuvres against the Purple Army. This started an ongoing war that was to last till the end of issue #38 as battles were fought through the towns of America, across country, in the sky and at sea. Christopher was a master of disguise and along with his friends would risk great danger to learn secrets from the invaders or to save friends or whole populations being massacred by vile people who chopped heads off, stuck swords into helpless women, bayoneted babies, gassed whole towns and so on. Against them was a brave rag-tag Army of Americans (never assisted by European allies) who fought as their frontiersmen ancestors had fought a century before them.
Patriot's Death Battalion: (Vol. 7, #3; August 1936) Emperor Rudolph has been upgraded to Warlord of the World and his grey clad hordes sweep westward across America and the issue ends with the American forces being bottled up and the Central Empire forces have marched down from Canada and is at their flank.
The Bloody Forty-Five Days: (Vol. 7, #4; October 1936) Has a loot-laden train thundering across America, bearing twenty million dollars in gold, something that Jimmy Christopher (called Jimmy Wentworth on the first page blurb, Richard Wentworth being The Spider's alias) needs to buy weapons with to fight the Purple hordes and ends with bacteria bombs being dropped on the American forces.
America's Plague Battalions: (Vol. 8, #1; December 1936) The Purple Forces have taken Europe and Asia as well as two thirds of America. As the women of America fought back, Rudolph released his devastating cholera bombs. When you think things cannot get worse, the story ends with an immense fleet of Purple ships heading towards San Francisco.
Liberty's Suicide Legions: (Vol. 8, #2; January 1937) Starts with the invasion of the west coast by super-dreadnoughts which are armed with a secret weapon, under the evil Admiral Baroda (who of course speaks with a thick guttural language. In issue 2, the best of both worlds. "The Atlantis", a super-flying fortress is in the hands of Asiatics who speak in a guttural language) and ends with Marshal Kremer smashing through their defences and marching on San Bernardino.
The Siege of the Thousand Patriots: (Vol. 8, #3; February 1937) The Purple Emperor's forces smash their way east over the Rockies while Christopher tries a desperate raid deep into enemy territory to try and snatch victory from defeat. #31 ends with an enemy consignment of secret weapons heading for the Rockies and they have to head it off.
Patriot's Death march: (Vol. 8, #4; March 1937) America are all but beaten and now a desperate fight back begins but things do not go well.
Revolt of the Lost Legions: (Vol. 9, #1; May 1937) In which America is beaten and in chains, labouring for a blood maddened dictator and defiant patriots have their heads cut off but Christopher fights on, planning to snatch the Emperor's own weapons and use them against him.
Drums of Destruction: (Vol. 9, #2; July 1937) The goose-stepping armies of the Purple Emperor are massed in the passes of the Continental Divide and ready to swoop down on the American defenders but Operator #5 makes a dash into occupied territory where every hand is against him and his capture worth a whole providence to the captor. #34 ends with Rudolph threatening the death of every eldest son in the occupied territories if the Americans do not withdraw from the Continental Divide within days.
The Army Without A Country: (Vol. 9, #3; September 1937) Has America fighting back again but when they charge the Purple Army, they find them hiding behind a wall of helpless Americans but by the end of the issue, the Purple army are routed and have taken to the hills.
The Bloody Frontiers: (Vol. 9, #4; November 1937) Where we find that the Purple forces are not defeated and a decimated America launches primitive warfare against them - and on top of this, they must face the Goth warriors of Urslup the Strong. Christopher kills Urslup in mortal combat but the issue ends with news that Shah Hi Mung's Mongol troops, having invaded America, have won a number of battles against American forces are now marching on New York. Worse, Charleston has been shelled, Purple soldiers have landed and all the residents have been put to the sword.
The Coming of the Mongol Hordes: (Vol. 10, #1; January 1938) Has the Mongol horde thundering through Pennsylvania, severed heads hanging from their saddles as they headed for New York with only a small band of gallant patriots waiting at Valley Forge to try and stop them. The thin line holds against the Mongols but the Purple fleet are now advancing on New York.
The Siege That Brought the Black Death: (Vol. 10, #2; March 1938) End of The Purple Invasion story arc. As the title of the issue tells us, the Purple Emperor Rudolph unleashes the Black Death on American forces as they are harassed by Mongol hordes on land and bombarded from the sea by the Purple fleet. The issue ends with the cowardly Rudolph at Jimmy Christopher's mercy - but he is shot by one of his own men whom he had tortured for a mistake. The Purple invasion ends as the defeated force sails off. The series now returns to single-issue wars.
Revolt of the Devil-Men: (Vol. 10, #3; May 1938) As a ravaged America sought to rebuild itself, the evil Brown Shirts tried to enslave an exhausted America but were finally beaten with their leaders executed.
The Suicide Battalion: (Vol. 10, #4; July 1938) The first attack came from a force in Canada but Christopher and his friends trace the real menace to Europe and they go there to confront the three bandit nations of the Old World who are lined up against them. Germany and Italy were defeated but Japan is still to be reckoned with.
The Day of the Damned: (Vol. 11, #1; September 1938) In which Japan continues its war against America, using the Mexican people and armed with the latest in mechanical warfare and tropical diseases. The Japanese are beaten back and leave America and Mexico as Diane recovers from the fever that almost killed her.
The Dawn That Shook the World: (Vol. 11, #2; November 1938) England and France have already fallen under the Invasion of the "New Dawn" and now the deathless men are taking over America.
When Hell Came to America: (Vol. 11, #3; January 1939) Another dictator attacks America and small towns vanish before the onslaught of a new weapon.
Invasion From the Sky: (Vol. 11, #4; March 1939) Airships come from the sky and the invaders are armed with a fire that cannot be extinguished.
Winged Hordes of the Yellow Vulture: (Vol. 12, #1; May 1939) Began the invasion by the "Yellow Vulture" force (which would see out the series) with a huge air armada sweeping over America and releasing plague germs. They are of course Japs, led by Moto Taronago (who had been head of the Japanese Secret Police) and his puppet, King Enoch. South Americans are persuaded to join the Japs and the issue ends with them overwhelming Texas and Louisiana.
War Tanks of the Yellow Vulture: (Vol. 12, #2; July 1939) Much of middle America is now beaten and the Vulture's hordes advance on the remaining patriots in California. The story ends with the news that many of the steel-producing plants in America have been destroyed, thus depriving the Americans of ammunition.
Corpse Cavalry of the Yellow Vulture: (Vol. 12, #3; September 1939) Enemy tanks march across America and their new weapon is unleashed which turns day into darkest night. When Christopher finally triumphs comes the worst news of all: Washington DC has been totally obliterated. The President, his aides, and John Christopher are all gone.
The Army From Underground: (Vol. 12, #4; November 1939) Worse comes to worst. Tanks that can burrow under American lines, assassins firing at America's leaders, exploding corpses, Diane kidnapped by the Japs, a treacherous Japanese princess "She" who takes over, Nan Christopher in the path of tanks with giant blades fitted to them, designed to cut people to pieces, and the issue and series ends with the total destruction of Canada and the Japanese advancing on the small group of remaining American forces.
Hell's Lost Battalion: (January 1940) Not published

References

Plus information from the original pulp magazines.

External links
Download a free issue of Operator#5 to read
Galactic Central Magazine Datafile for Operator #5
The Vintage Library@ Operator #5
Operator #5 Covers
Z-7's Headquarters: an Operator #5 Blog

Fictional secret agents and spies
Literary characters introduced in 1934
Magazines established in 1934
Magazines disestablished in 1939
Defunct science fiction magazines published in the United States
Bimonthly magazines published in the United States
Monthly magazines published in the United States
Magazines published in New York City